This is a list of the Mayors of New Haven, Connecticut.

Before 1826, the city's mayors did not have a fixed term of office; once elected, they held office indefinitely, at the pleasure of the Connecticut General Assembly. Beginning in 1826 the mayor and members of the Common Council were elected an annual town meeting and held office until the following year's town meeting. Since the 1870s, New Haven's mayors have been elected to two-year terms.

As of January 2015, the Mayor of New Haven earns an annual salary of $131,000.

See also
Mayoral elections in New Haven, Connecticut

References

Citations

Sources 

 Robert A. Dahl (1961), Who Governs?: Democracy and Power in an American City. Yale University Press. , . Table 2.1, The Mayors of New Haven, 1784–1960 (pages 12–14).

 
New Haven, Connecticut
History of New Haven, Connecticut